Benjamin Burtt Jr. (born July 12, 1948) is an American sound designer, film director and editor, screenwriter, and voice actor. As a sound designer, his credits include the Star Wars and Indiana Jones film series, Invasion of the Body Snatchers (1978), E.T. the Extra-Terrestrial (1982), WALL-E (2008), and Star Trek (2009).

Burtt is notable for popularizing the Wilhelm scream in-joke and creating many of the iconic sound effects heard in the Star Wars film franchise, including the 'voice' of R2-D2, the lightsaber hum, the sound of the blaster guns, the heavy-breathing sound of Darth Vader and creating the Ewoks’ language, ewokese. Burtt was also the sound editor for WALL-E and performed the vocalizations of the titular character as well as other robots in the film.

Burtt has won four Academy Awards, two of which are Special Achievement Academy Awards. He has also directed numerous documentary films and was the editor of the Star Wars prequel trilogy.

Early life
Burtt was born in Jamesville, New York, on July 12, 1948. The son of a chemistry professor and a child psychologist, Burtt made films as a child, and later studied physics at Allegheny College, Pennsylvania, graduating in 1970.

Career

Early career
Burtt made films during his time in college, and in 1970 won a National Student Film Festival for his war film entitled Yankee Squadron, reputedly after following exposure to classic aviation drama. He had previously made an amateur film at the Old Rhinebeck Aerodrome, a living aviation museum in Red Hook, New York, under guidance from its founder, Cole Palen.

For his work on the special-effects film Genesis, Burtt won a scholarship to the University of Southern California, where he earned a master's degree in film production.

Sound designer
Burtt pioneered many aspects of modern sound design, especially in the science-fiction and fantasy-film genres. Before his work in the first Star Wars (now known as Star Wars Episode IV: A New Hope) in 1977, science-fiction films tended to use electronic-sounding effects for futuristic devices. Burtt sought a more natural sound, blending in "found sounds" to create the effects. The lightsaber hum, for instance, was derived from a film projector idling combined with feedback from a broken television set, and the blaster effect started with the sound acquired from hitting a guy-wire on a radio tower with a hammer.

In the Star Wars series, part of R2-D2's beeps and whistles are Burtt's vocalizations, also made using an ARP 2600 synthesizer, as are some of the squawks made by the tiny holographic monsters on the Millennium Falcon spacecraft. In Star Wars: Episode III – Revenge of the Sith (2005), Burtt's provided the voice for Lushros Dofine, captain of the Invisible Hand cruiser. The heavy breathing of Darth Vader was created by recording Burtt's own breathing in an old Dacor scuba regulator.

Burtt used the voice of an elderly lady that he had met in a photography shop for the voice of E.T. the Extra-Terrestrial. The woman's low pitch was the result of very heavy smoking, specifically Kool cigarettes. Burtt created the "voice" of the title character and many other robots in Pixar's film WALL-E (2008), about a lonely garbage-compacting robot. Additionally, Burtt is responsible for the sound effects in Indiana Jones and the Kingdom of the Crystal Skull (2008).

Burtt has a reputation for including a sound effect dubbed "the Wilhelm scream" in many of the movies he has worked on. Taken from a character named "Wilhelm" in the film The Charge at Feather River, the sound can be heard in a large number of films, including in Star Wars Episode IV: A New Hope when a stormtrooper falls into a chasm and in Raiders of the Lost Ark when a Nazi soldier falls off the back of a moving car.

One of Burtt's more subtle sound effects is the "audio black hole." In Attack of the Clones, Burtt's use of the audio black hole involved the insertion of a short interval of absolute silence in the audio track, just prior to the detonation of "seismic charges" fired at the escaping Jedi spaceship. The effect of this short (less than one second) of silence is to accentuate the resulting explosion in the mind of the listener. Burtt has recalled the source of this idea as follows: "I think back to where that idea might have come to me...I remember in film school a talk I had with an old retired sound editor who said they used to leave a few frames of silence in the track just before a big explosion. In those days they would 'paint' out the optical sound with ink. Then I thought of the airlock entry sequence in 2001. I guess the seeds were there for me to nourish when it came to the seismic charges."

Burtt was among the golden ears that critically reviewed the various audio compression systems that were proposed for the ATSC 1.0 digital television system.

A tongue-in-cheek homage to Burtt appears in the 1997 Activision PC game Zork: Grand Inquisitor - the spell 'Beburtt', which 'creates the illusion of inclement weather', plays dramatic thunderclap and rainfall sounds when cast.

Director, editor, and writer
Burtt has directed several IMAX documentary films, including Blue Planet, Destiny in Space, and the Oscar-nominated Special Effects: Anything Can Happen. He edited the entire Star Wars prequel trilogy, and several episodes of The Young Indiana Jones Chronicles. Burtt also wrote several episodes of the 1980s Star Wars cartoon Droids.

Cameo appearances
Burtt makes a cameo appearance in two of the Star Wars films as an extra. In Return of the Jedi, he appeared as Colonel Dyer, the Imperial officer who yells "Freeze!" before Han Solo knocks him off a balcony. The scream as Burtt falls is his own imitation of the Wilhelm scream that he popularized. In Episode I – The Phantom Menace, Burtt appears in the background of the end celebration scene; his character is named Ebenn Q3 Baobab, a reference to a Droids character.

Filmography

Film

Television

Video games
 WALL-E (2008) - WALL·E / M-O / Robots
 Lego The Incredibles (2018) - WALL•E
 Star Wars Jedi: Fallen Order (2019) - BD-1
 Disney Dreamlight Valley (2022) - Wall E

Awards

Academy Awards
 Best Sound Effects Editing in 1989 for Indiana Jones and the Last Crusade
 Best Sound Effects Editing in 1982 for E.T. the Extra-Terrestrial
 Special Achievement for Sound Effects Editing in Raiders of the Lost Ark (1981)
 Special Achievement for Sound Effects Editing in Star Wars (1977)
 Nominated for:
 Best Sound Mixing and Best Sound Editing in 2008 for WALL-E
 Best Sound Effects Editing in 1999 for Star Wars: Episode I – The Phantom Menace
 Best Documentary Short Subject in 1996 for directing Special Effects: Anything Can Happen
 Best Sound in 1989 for Indiana Jones and the Last Crusade
 Best Sound Effects Editing in 1988 for Willow
 Best Sound and Best Sound Effects Editing in 1983 for Return of the Jedi

Annie Awards
 Nominated: Voice Acting in a Feature Production in 2008 for WALL-E

Honorary Awards
Burtt was awarded the Doctor of Arts, honoris causa, by Allegheny College on May 9, 2004.

The Hollywood Post Alliance awarded him with The Charles S. Swartz Award for outstanding contributions to the field of post production.

References

External links
 Skywalker Sound
 
 
 Site detailing the history of The Wilhelm Scream
 Interview with Ben Burtt on Silicon Valley Radio
 Interview with Ben Burtt on Studio 360 about his career
 CineSource Magazine - Ben Burtt and the Sound of WALL-E

1948 births
Living people
Nottingham High School (Syracuse, New York) alumni
American male voice actors
Male actors from New York (state)
USC School of Cinematic Arts alumni
Allegheny College alumni
Special Achievement Academy Award winners
Best Sound BAFTA Award winners
Best Sound Editing Academy Award winners
American sound editors
American sound designers
People from DeWitt, New York
Lucasfilm people